Denise Baby was a French film editor known for her work on titles like Le colonel Durand and The Passerby. She also worked as an assistant director on 1954's The Secret of Helene Marimon.

Selected filmography 
As editor:

 Atout sexe (1971)
 The Wall (1967)
 Destination Rome (1963)
 In the French Style (1963) (sound effects)
 The Trial (1962)
 The Heirs (1960)
 The Motorcycle Cops (1959) 
 My Darned Father (1958) 
 Vive les vacances (1958) 
 Les violents (1957) 
 Fatal Affair (1953) 
 The Passerby (1951) 
 Le colonel Durand (1948) 
 Six Hours to Lose (1947)

As assistant director:

 The Secret of Helene Marimon (1954)

References 

French film editors
French women film editors
Year of birth missing
Year of death missing